Ober St. Veit  is a station on  of the Vienna U-Bahn. It is located in the Hietzing District. It opened in 1981.

History

Ober St. Veit is named after Ober Sankt Veit, one of the 9 district sections of Hietzing.

The station was built for the Wientallinie of the Viennese Metropolitan Railway (Stadtbahn), which ran between the stations Hütteldorf and Meidling Hauptstraße in 1898. It was opened on 1 June 1898. In 1925, the Stadtbahn switched from steam power to electric power. Unlike other stations along the Wientallinie of the Stadtbahn, this station was barely damaged during the Second World War. The station building, designed with Otto Wagner's architectural style, still remains standing to this day, but the rest of the station was completely renovated in 1977. It was reopened to the public on 20 December 1981, along with the opening of the U4 subway line. Another entrance to the station with elevators was built - this was opened to the public on 21 December 2001.

References

Buildings and structures in Hietzing
Railway stations opened in 1981
1981 establishments in Austria
Vienna U-Bahn stations
Railway stations in Austria opened in the 20th century